Jearl Margaritha (born 10 April 2000) is a Dutch professional footballer who plays as a forward for Eerste Divisie club TOP Oss.

Club career
Evolved in youth academies of Groningen and FC Emmen, Margaritha joined Dutch fifth division side VV Hoogeveen ahead of 2019–20 Hoofdklasse season. On 1 September 2019, he made his competitive debut for the team in a 3–0 loss against Alphense Boys. He scored his first goal two weeks later in a 5–4 loss against Quick '20.

On 9 January 2020, Hoogeveen announced the departure of Margaritha to Almere City. However, it took almost two months to finalize the deal as he didn't have a contract with Hoogeveen. On 6 September 2020, he scored his first professional goal in his team's 6–4 win against Excelsior.

On 4 August 2021, Margaritha joined Eerste Divisie club TOP Oss.

International career
Born in Netherlands, Margaritha is eligible to play for Curaçao due to his heritage. In November 2020, Curaçao national team head coach Guus Hiddink named Margaritha in 23-man squad for one week's training camp.

References

External links
 

2000 births
Living people
Dutch footballers
Association football forwards
Eerste Divisie players
Derde Divisie players
Vierde Divisie players
Almere City FC players
TOP Oss players